Kajiado West constituency is an electoral sub-county In Kajiado County Kenya. The current member of parliament is George Sunkuiya who came after winning 2017 election over Moses Ole Sakuda. Kajiado West has five wards, They include Keekonyokie, magadi ward, iloodokilani, Ewuaso oo nkidong'i ward and mosiro ward.
Each of which has a member of the County Assembly. This constituency has a population of about 104,300 people and 52,453 registered voters.
Kajiado west has major towns such as Ngong which also include Ngong Hills, part of Kiserian and the Kiserian dam and isinya.

References 

Constituencies in Kajiado County